On 1 March 1959, elections were held for the Supreme Soviets of the Soviet Union's constituent republics.

According to Soviet law, 2,793,000 out of an eligible adult voting population of 136,416,000 were disenfranchised for various reasons.

References
The Distinctiveness of Soviet Law. Ferdinand Joseph Maria Feldbrugge, ed. Martinus Nijhoff Publishers: Dordrecht (1987): 110.

1959 elections in the Soviet Union
Regional elections in the Soviet Union
March 1959 events in Europe 
March 1959 events in Asia